The New Hampshire Historical Society is an independent nonprofit in Concord that saves, preserves, and shares New Hampshire history.

Introduction
The New Hampshire Historical Society was founded in 1823. The society has an extensive collection of objects and archives related to New Hampshire's history. Each year, the society uses its collections to serve members and visitors through its research library, museum, publications, and outreach programs. The society's education programs reach children from communities across the state.

The society is an independent, non-profit organization. The society depends on contributions from private sources to fund its operations.

Collections
The society is the state's primary organization for collecting, preserving, and sharing Granite State history. Its museum and library offer extensive collections of resources and materials related to New Hampshire history.

The society collects objects, books, manuscripts, and images that document New Hampshire's history. The collections include approximately 33,000 museum objects, 50,000 printed volumes, 1.5 million pages of manuscripts, 800,000 pages of newspapers, 250,000 photographic images, 10,000 broadsides and ephemera items. Ranging in date from pre-contact to the present day, the Society's holdings reflect broadly the state's economic, political, social, and cultural history.

Research services
The New Hampshire Historical Society's staff is prepared to assist in general research on New Hampshire history and genealogy by using any sources found in their library or museum. Research services can be requested by contacting the society.

Facilities

The Society's headquarters building at 30 Park Street in Concord is home to the research library, exhibitions, and school and public programs. This 1911 landmark building, funded by Edward and Julia Tuck, is listed on the National Register of Historic Places. A mid-19th-century building at 6 Eagle Square, named the Hamel Center after major benefactors to the Society, housed the Society's museum exhibition galleries from 1995 to 2014 and is now used for collections and administrative management and office rental space.

Exhibitions
The society offers changing exhibitions on a variety of topics and long-term displays of selected objects including paintings, New Hampshire-made furniture, the original eagle from the New Hampshire State House, and Revolutionary War flags.

Education
The society offers a variety of educational programs, including school tours at the museum, outreach programs to classrooms across the state, workshops, lectures, demonstrations, courses, family days, and technical workshops for local historical societies and libraries. The society published a New Hampshire history curriculum for grades K-12.

Publications
The society publishes a semi-annual journal, Historical New Hampshire, and a quarterly newsletter featuring information on the society's events and activities. Additional special publications include exhibition catalogs, gallery brochures, and school activity guides. The society's publications have received awards from the American Association for State and Local History.

Governing board and staff
The society is governed by a 20-member board of trustees. The society employs 13 full-time and 25 part-time staff, assisted by 80 volunteers.

Fellowships
Along with 18 other cultural organizations, the New Hampshire Historical Society is a member of the New England Regional Fellowship Consortium, which offers grants for projects that draw on the collections and resources of the collaborating organizations.

Membership
All of the New Hampshire Historical Society's programs and services are made possible by membership dues and contributions from individuals, foundations, and businesses.

Accreditation
The New Hampshire Historical Society is accredited by the American Alliance of Museums.

References
The Act of Incorporation, Constitution, and By-Laws of the New Hampshire Historical Society, 1823, Jacob B. Moore, Concord, NH.
Croom, Emily Anne. The Genealogist's Companion and Sourcebook, 2003, Betterway Books, Cincinnati, OH.
Karr, Paul. Frommer's Vermont, New Hampshire and Maine, 2010, Wiley Publishing, Hoboken, NJ.
Landry, Linda. Classic New Hampshire, Preserving the Granite State in Changing Times, 2003, University Press of New England, Lebanon, NH.

External links
New Hampshire Historical Society website
Association of Historical Societies of New Hampshire
New England Regional Fellowship Consortium

State historical societies of the United States
History museums in New Hampshire
Museums in Merrimack County, New Hampshire
Buildings and structures in Concord, New Hampshire
Tourist attractions in Concord, New Hampshire
Historical societies in New Hampshire